Parsonsia alboflavescens is a woody vine of the family Apocynaceae, found from tropical and subtropical Asia to Northern Australia.
In the Northern Territory of Australia, where it occurs in Arnhem Land, it has been declared "near threatened".

Taxonomy
Parsonsia alboflavescens was first described in 1818, by Dennstedt, as Periploca alboflavescens. It was described many times.  The current name is that given by Mabberley in 1977, who, working through the many names, found that Dennstedt's publication preceded all others, which meant that this Parsonsia took the species epithet, alboflavescens.

Type illustrations
(See Middleton.)

Etymology
Robert Brown gave the generic name, Parsonsia, to honour James Parsons (1705–1770). The species epithet, alboflavescens, is derived from the Latin  (white).  (turning yellow, becoming yellow) and refers to the flower.

References

External links
Botanical illustrations of Parsonsia alboflavescens.

alboflavescens
Gentianales of Australia
Flora of the Northern Territory
Flora of China
Flora of tropical Asia
Flora of the Bismarck Archipelago
Flora of the Solomon Islands (archipelago)
Plants described in 1818
Vines
Taxa named by David Mabberley